The Appalled Economists (in French: Économistes atterrés) is an association created by economists who "resist the neoliberal orthodoxy" in order to "publicly promote" their "collective works and proposals."

Establishment
On 24 September 2010, economists Philippe Askenazy of the CNRS; Thomas Coutrot of ATTAC; André Orléan, president of the French Association for Political Economy; and Henri Sterdyniak of the OFCE signed a common manifesto that aimed to "denounce and refute" the so-called dominant orthodoxy in economic policy across Europe. Following the popular reception of the manifesto and various public interventions by its signatories, the Appalled Economists were formed in 2011.

Views
Since its creation, the association has criticized French governments of not challenging the "German-shaped, established European order" in economics.

In their publications, the association stands in opposition to what they call the "neoliberal doxa". They reject "globalization in the service of finance", criticize a "Europe where employment and social protection have become factors of adjustment to the insensitive profit motive of shareholders," and denounce the "instrumentalization of public debt" as well as the policies of a "fiscal counterrevolution" that ostensibly serves only society's "richest".

They propose a drastic reduction in tax loopholes, the creation of new income tax brackets, and the introduction of a European fiscal snake (i.e. to have variable and fluctuating VAT levels within a certain range). The crisis in Europe, according to the association, is "systemic." They suggest that the problem should not be viewed as that of a "winning" Germany opposed to southern countries which are in default. The association's economists suggest that both Eurozone's north and south of the eurozone should take steps: the north towards increasing domestic demand and the south against tax evasion and corruption.

Criticism
The positions adopted by the Appalled have come under attack from many quarters. Labor market economists Pierre Cahuc and :fr:André Zylberberg accuse them of denying the  consensus in economics, a discipline that should be treated, according to them, as a science like biology or physics.

See also
Heterodox economics
Eurozone crisis
Frédéric Lordon

Notes

References

External links
Official website

Advocacy groups in France
Economics societies
Eurozone crisis
Economy of the European Union
Great Recession in Europe
Eurozone
Government debt